Harold Aidoo Fiifi (born 5 April 1996) is a Ghanaian-Finnish professional basketball player for CB Benicarló of the LEB Plata.

Personal
Aidoo was born in Accra, Ghana but moved to Helsinki, Finland at age 5.

College career
As a member of Grand Canyon State University's basketball team Aidoo played under former NBA All-Star Dan Majerle.
On 7 December 2016 he scored his then-college career high 15 points when he shot 3 of 5 three pointers, 2 of them late in the game at a 76–72 victory against San Diego State.

Professional career
Aidoo started out his career at HBA-Marsky Helsinki where he played from 2012 to 2016. During the 2018–19 Korisliiga season, he played for Ura Basket. In 2019, Aidoo represented Joensuu's Kataja Basket and later joined the team's competitor Kobrat of the Korisliiga. With Kobrat, he averaged 9.0 points, 3.1 rebounds and 3.4 assists.

In 2020, he moved to CB Benicarlo in Spain on a one-year contract.

National team career
Aidoo has been a member of Finland's national basketball team.

References

External links
Profile at Eurobasket.com
Profile at NetScouts Basketball
GCU Bio

1996 births
Living people
Finnish expatriate basketball people in the United States
Finnish expatriate basketball people in Spain
Finnish men's basketball players
Finnish people of Ghanaian descent
Ghanaian men's basketball players
Grand Canyon Antelopes men's basketball players
Point guards
Sportspeople from Accra
Sportspeople from Helsinki